Hans Smees (born 3 August 1970) is a Dutch motorcycle racer. He won the Dutch 250cc Championship in 2005 and 2006.

Career statistics

Grand Prix motorcycle racing

By season

Races by year
(key)

References

External links
 Profile on MotoGP.com

Living people
1970 births
Dutch motorcycle racers
250cc World Championship riders
21st-century Dutch people